The 2015 Babergh District Council election took place on 7 May 2015 to elect members of Babergh District Council in England. This was on the same day as the general election and other local elections.

Summary Result
The results saw the Conservatives gain 14 seats and take 31 of the 43 seats to get an overall majority on the council. This was the first time since the formation of the council that any party had a majority of the seats. As was the case nationally, the Liberal Democrats suffered heavy losses.  Meanwhile, Labour lost two of its three seats and held onto its last seat in Great Cornard North by 1 vote.  The Green Party lost South Cosford to the Conservatives, a seat they had gained in a 2014 by-election, and subsequently lost all representation on the Council.

|}

Ward results

Alton

Berners

Boxford

Brook

Bures St. Mary

Chadacre

Dodnash

Glemsford and Stanstead

Cornard North

Great Cornard South

References

2015 English local elections
May 2015 events in the United Kingdom
2015
2010s in Suffolk